The 24th Grey Cup was played on December 5, 1936, before 5,883 fans at Varsity Stadium at Toronto.

The Sarnia Imperials defeated the Ottawa Rough Riders 26–20.

External links
 
 

Grey Cup
Grey Cups hosted in Toronto
Grey Cup
1936 in Ontario
December 1936 sports events
1930s in Toronto
Ottawa Rough Riders